Ectrodactyly-polydactyly syndrome is a very rare congenital limb malformation syndrome of genetic origin which is characterized a combination of ectrodactyly and polydactyly consisting of underdeveloped/absent central rays of the hands or feet alongside postaxial polydactyly in the same limb that can range from a hypoplastic, bone-devoid extra digit to a fully developed supernumerary digit. It has been described in 4 children from a single sibship in Belgium.

References 

Rare genetic syndromes
Congenital disorders of musculoskeletal system
Supernumerary body parts